Emu, later Brightside, was an iron-hulled paddle steamer that was built in Scotland in 1864 for use in Australia. For her first few years she worked on the Brisbane River and Moreton Bay. From 1868 she was a local ferry in Sydney Harbour. From 1902 she was a cargo ship. She was scrapped in Sydney in 1909.

Building
A. & J. Inglis built Emu in Pointhouse, Glasgow, launching her in March 1864. She was then dismantled and transport as a "knock-down ship" to be reassembled in Australia. The steamship Platypus brought her in sections from Scotland to Queensland, where she was reassembled at Kangaroo Point, Brisbane. She was re-launched on 5 August 1865.

She had a pair of two-cylinder inverted diagonal steam engines, which between them were rated at 70 NHP. She was a double-ended craft, with at rudder at each end.

Career

Emus first owner was the Queensland Steam Navigation Company, which registered her in Brisbane. She worked on the Brisbane River and Moreton Bay.

In 1868 the Australasian Steam Navigation Company (ASNC) acquired Emu, registered her in Melbourne and operated her on Port Phillip. Later that year the ASNC moved her to Sydney and re-registered her there.

In 1887 the company renamed her Brightside. In June 1897 she sank at Neutral Bay. She was raised, and returned to service that year. In 1902 she was converted into a cargo ship. She continued working the Manly route until 1908 when she was gutted by fire. Her hull was converted to a lighter, but in 1909 she was scrapped. Her engines were used in a sawmill.

See also
 List of Sydney Harbour ferries
 Timeline of Sydney Harbour ferries

References

External links

Ferry transport in Sydney
Paddle steamers of Australia
Ships built in Glasgow
Ferries of New South Wales